Willie Young may refer to:

Sports

American football
Willie Young (offensive tackle, born 1943), American football player
Willie Young (offensive tackle, born 1947) (1947–2008), American football player
Willie Young (defensive end) (born 1985), American football player

Association football
Willie Young (footballer, born 1951), Scottish association footballer who played in defence for Aberdeen, Tottenham Hotspur and Arsenal
Willie Young (footballer, born 1956), Scottish association footballer who played on the wing for Aston Villa and Torquay United
Willie Young (referee), Scottish football referee in 2003–04 Scottish League Cup

Other sports
Willie Young (curler) (died 1986), Scottish curler
Willie Young (baseball) (1912–2002), American baseball player
Willie Young (basketball) (born 1973), American basketball coach and former player

Other
Willie Wayne Young (born 1942), American artist

See also
William Young (disambiguation)